Drumshanbo (ridge of the old huts) is a small town situated in the heart of County Leitrim, Ireland. Drumshanbo is surrounded by a scenic area of soft rolling hills, woodlands, lakes and the Sliabh an Iarainn and Arigna mountains. It is a well preserved town with traditional pubs, shops, and restaurants.

Geography
Drumshanbo is situated at the lower tip of Lough Allen the third biggest lake on the Shannon. It is overlooked by Sliabh an Iarainn, the iron mountain, which is approximately 585 metres high, with a history of iron being mined there for over three hundred years.

Economy
Local industries include: metalwork fabrication, sign-makers, plant hire and refuse disposal, tele-sales, joinery works, and many small craft businesses. Laird House was developed recently and it includes offices and a crèche facility. Currently the site of the old factory premises is being redeveloped by the Community Council to house a large food production facility. Anchor tenants are already secured and it is anticipated to generate up to 100 jobs in the industry. Drumshanbo is well supplied with housing, much of it unoccupied, after the collapse of the housing market in 2007.

Transport 
The town is centred on the crossroads of the R207 and R208 regional roads.

Rail transport
Drumshanbo railway station opened on 2 May 1888, but finally closed on 1 April 1959. It was part of the narrow gauge Cavan and Leitrim Railway. Today the nearest rail services may be accessed at Carrick-on-Shannon railway station around 14 km (8.5 miles) away.

Bus/coach transport
Westlink Coaches operate a daily commuter service between Drumshanbo and Sligo via Carrick-on-Shannon.
Drumshanbo is also served by Bus Éireann route 462 on Fridays and Saturdays linking it to Sligo and by Saturday-only route 469 linking it to Carrick-on-Shannon and Longford.

Tourism and facilities
In the centre of the town there is the Sliabh an Iarann visitors' centre, where an audio-visual display takes visitors through local scenery and highlights the history of coal and iron mining in the area. A wide variety of walks, including hill-walking, can be explored within a 5-km (3 mile) radius of Drumshanbo. Many walking routes around the lake have been signed posted by the Council. Also, for the more adventurous, Slí Liatroma is a 48-km (30 miles) walk between Drumshanbo, Dowra, and Manorhamilton.

A kilometre outside the town is the heated outdoor swimming pool at Acres Lake Amenity. Also there are tennis courts, a playground, and a jetty for cruisers which have travelled from Carrick on Shannon via Leitrim Village. The Teach Ceoil or Music House is also situated here. It is used as a venue for music sessions etc.

In 2003 the  opened on the shore of Lough Allen, and offering hotel accommodation, lodges, and apartments. Nearby, the  hosts bingo every Monday night, provides Irish handball and badminton facilities, and hosts occasional events such as Discos, Concerts, plays and the mobile cinema.  is another community premises which is used for various local groups to meet, and some classes are organised there by a local women's group.

Sport
For the angler, Lough Allen is the largest lake in the vicinity and has a reputation for coarse angling. The lake has a plentiful supply of trout, pike, perch, rudd and roach. However, there is also an abundance of good fishing at small locations all around the surrounding area. It is possible to rent cruisers to navigate the waterways and enjoy the natural unspoilt countryside of the area. Lough Allen also is ideal for wind surfing, canoeing and other water sports.

Moorlands Equestrian Centre has been established over ten years ago and it provides a comprehensive range of activities, which include all aspects of equestrian sport. It is an outstanding facility for the novice to the advanced rider. For the visitor there is pony trekking, mountain trails, lakeside rides or cross-country treks.

Drumshanbo also is an ideal base for the golfing enthusiast. There are four courses in the area. These include Carrick on Shannon (18 holes), Blacklion (9 holes), Slieve Russell (18 holes), and Ballinamore (9 holes).

Allen Gaels are the local GAA club, and have been county champions in both Gaelic football and hurling.

Events
Drumshanbo has a growing population of over 1,000. In the third week of July, the town hosts the Joe Mooney Summer School for Irish Music. This festival is now in its sixteenth year and attracts Irish music enthusiasts from all over the world. As the name suggests it is a memorial and tribute to the late Joseph Mooney, County Councillor and townsman who did so much to promote the cause of Leitrim and his beloved town.

The An Tostal festival in June also has an emphasis on Irish music and culture. This was established nationwide in the 1950s by Bord Failte as a tourist promotion to encourage emigrants home. Drumshanbo is the only location in Ireland where it has survived into the 21st century.

The Sliabh An Iarainn Walking Festival takes place 11 and 12 April 2015. There are two days of graded A,B,C walks for walkers of all abilities.

Religion
Drumshanbo has three churches and a convent.

The Roman Catholic Church built in 1845 is dedicated to St Patrick and commemorates his first crossing of the Shannon nearby. The old church stood on a site in the famine graveyard in 1744 further out of town.

St John's Church of Ireland dates back to 1829. It is a gothic style structure ornamented with a tower and pinnacles.

The present Methodist Church on the Carrick Road was built in 1860; however, there had been an earlier chapel dating back to 1760s.

The Poor Clare Convent was built in 1860. The Sisters are Franciscian Poor Clares and as such observe strict enclosure, recite the Divine Office in choir and maintain Perpetual Adoration of the Blessed Sacrament. The nuns pray around the clock and as it is an enclosed order they never leave the convent except in the event of a medical emergency. In the last refurbishment of the convent chapel, it was possible to integrate the community of nuns with the Public to a greater degree than previously.

Education
Drumshanbo has both a large primary school and a vocational secondary school, which provide education for local children until the age of eighteen. Drumshanbo Vocational was opened in 1964, with major extensions in 1985 and 2012 and a further extension due to start in 2015. In 2014 a 50th anniversary magazine was launched with over 50 contributions from pupils and teachers from all decades, photos from same and a comprehensive list of all past pupils.

History

Drumshanbo town originated from the extensive Iron industry around Slieve Anierin from the 17th century. Pig iron produced at Iron smelting works on the east of Slieve Anierin was brought south across Lough Allen to Drumshanbo Finery forge where a malleable iron product was produced and transported to Dublin and Limerick by boat. The first ship built by the East India company in Limerick was supposedly finished with the product from Drumshanbo Iron works. According to folklore the "". Long ago Ireland had been covered in Woodland, a claim echoed in a 19th-century survey of Leitrim- "". These great forests in Leitrim and on the west side of Lough Allen were denuded for the making for Charcoal for Iron works around Slieve Anierin. Immense piles of cleared timber existed at Drumshanbo in 1782.

Throughout at least the 19th and 20th centuries, fairs were held at Drumshanbo on- 12 February (or 15th), 12 May (or 17th), 11 (or 16) July, 6 October, and 16 November. In 1925, Drumshanbo village comprised 77 houses, 17 being licensed to sell alcohol.

Some 500 victims of the Great Famine are buried at a famine-period burial ground at Drumshanbo.

Historical figures include

 Father Canice Mooney (1911-1963), a respected Franciscan nuascoláirí (new scholar), was born in Drumshanbo. An academic he wrote books on the Irish Franciscans.

International relations

Twin towns – Sister cities
Drumshanbo is twinned with Locquirec in Brittany, France, and Emerson, Georgia, United States.

Notable residents
 Singer songwriter and Eurovision winner Charlie McGettigan has been a Drumshanbo resident since 1973.

References

Primary sources

Secondary sources

 
Towns and villages in County Leitrim
Populated places on the River Shannon